GR-196,429 is a melatonin receptor agonist with some selectivity for the MT1 subtype. It was one of the first synthetic melatonin agonists developed and continues to be used in scientific research, though it has never been developed for medical use. Studies in mice have shown GR-196,429 to produce both sleep-promoting effects and alterations of circadian rhythm, as well as stimulating melatonin release.

References 

Acetamides
Melatonin receptor agonists